The following is a list for the MTV Movie & TV Award winners for Best Scared-As-Shit Performance. The award was first given out in 2005, and then in 2006. In 2010 this award was renamed from Best Frightened Performance and renamed to Most Frightened Performance in 2022. The award was not presented in 2012. In 2013, it was given back its original name, Best Scared-As-Shit Performance. As of 2016, there have been seven winners of the award with five women and two men. Actresses Dakota Fanning, Jessica Chastain and Victoria Pedretti hold the distinction of the only people to hold more than one nomination in the category, with Fanning winning the inaugural award in 2005 and Pedretti winning in 2021. The award returned in 2018 under the title Best Frightened Performance.

Winners and nominees

References

MTV Movie & TV Awards